Blue Rocks may refer to:

 Blue Rocks, Tasmania, Australia
 Blue Rocks, Nova Scotia, Canada
 Wilmington Blue Rocks, a Minor League Baseball team
 The Symplegades or Cyanean Rocks, at the Black Sea outlet of the Bosphorus

See also
 Blue Rock (disambiguation)